Filippelli is an Italian surname. Notable people with the name include:

 Filippo di Antonio Filippelli (1460–1506), Italian Renaissance painter 
 Gabriel Filippelli, American biogeochemist and professor of Earth sciences
 Gérard Filippelli (1942 – 2021), French actor, composer, and singer
 Riccardo Filippelli (1980), Italian sport shooter

See also 

 Filippi

References 

Surnames of Italian origin